The speedway event at the 2017 World Games was held at the Stadion Olimpijski in Poland. For the second time after the 1985 World Games, speedway was included in the World Games programme as an invitational sport. Polish team managed to win on home soil.

Participating nations

Medalists

Medal table

References

External links
 The World Games 2017 Wrocław

2017 World Games
2017 in speedway
Speedway in Poland